Gun Creek is the name of several watercourses and associated placenames in Canada and the United States.

Canada
Gun Creek (British Columbia), a tributary of the Bridge River in southern British Columbia
Gun Creek (Nahlin River), a tributary of the Nahlin River in northwestern British Columbia

United States
 Gun Creek (Arizona), a stream in Gila County, Arizona
 Gun Creek Corral
 Gun Creek (Idaho), a stream in Valley County, Idaho
 Gun Creek (Illinois), a stream in Franklin County, Illinois
 Gun Creek Public Use Area, a public use re in Franklin County, Illinois
 Gun Creek (Indiana), a stream in Clay County, Indiana
 Gun Creek (Kentucky), a stream in Magoffin County, Kentucky
 Gun Creek, Kentucky, a former populated place in Magoffin Country, Kentucky
 Gun Creek (Missouri), a stream in Randolph County, Missouri
 Gun Creek (New York), a stream in Erie County, New York state
 Gun Creek (Oregon), a stream in Marion County, Oregon
 American Fork, Utah in Utah County, Utah, is also known as Gun Creek

See also

 Gunn Creek, a stream in Valdez-Cordova census area, Alaska
 Gunn Valley, a valley in the Chilcotin region of British Columbia
 Gun Lake (disambiguation)